The Young Communist League (YCL) is the name used by the youth wing of various Communist parties around the world. The name YCL of XXX (name of country) originates from the precedent established by the Communist Youth International.

Examples of YCLs include:
 Australia – Young Communist League of Australia (now defunct; its eventual successor merged with the Left Alliance) 
 Britain – Young Communist League
 Canada – Young Communist League of Canada
 Cuba – Young Communist League
 France – Mouvement Jeunes Communistes de France
 Germany – Young Communist League of Germany
 Norway – Young Communist League of Norway
 Nepal – Young Communist League, Nepal
 Portugal – Young Communist League of Portugal
 Sweden – Young Communist League of Sweden
 U.S. – Young Communist League USA
 Russia – Leninist Young Communist League of the Russian Federation

In the Soviet Union the YCL was known as the Komsomol.

The corresponding youth organization in China is usually translated as Communist Youth League.

In Vietnam, the name of the Vietnamese YCL is translated as Ho Chi Minh Communist Youth Union

See also
Young Communists (disambiguation)

References

Youth wings of communist parties